San Roque Canyon is a canyon or valley in Santa Barbara County, California. San Roque Creek tributary to Arroyo Burro flows through it.

References

Canyons and gorges of California
Valleys of Santa Barbara County, California
Protected areas of Santa Barbara County, California